Government College Kasaragod (GCK) is the campus located in Vidyanagar, the Educational District of Kasaragod with 19 departments including degree courses, PG courses and research centers under Kannur University was established in 1957. The college is re-accredited with 'A' grade by NAAC. The college is now running with more than 1500 students, 100 teaching staffs and 40 Non-Teaching Staffs. The college has functioning facilities like Library, Computer Lab, Career Guidance and Placement Cell etc. and several active groups such as NSS, NCC, Bhoomithra Sena (BMS), Women Empowerment Cell (WEC) etc.

History

The Government College Kasaragod was established in 1957 by the Government of Kerala, in the premises of Government High School in Kasaragod Town, as a need was felt for a college in this underdeveloped area. It was the then Education Minister Prof. Joseph Mundasseri, who took the initiative in the matter. The college commenced functioning early in August 1957 in a corner of the High School building. The college affiliated to University of Kerala was formally inaugurated by the Honorable Minister of Finance, Sri. C. Achutha Menon on 7 August 1957. Prof. V. Gopalan Nair took over as the first principal of the college on 08-07-1957. Degree classes in Economics and Mathematics was started in 1958–1959. Steps were taken to speed up the construction work of the proposed new campus at Kunhimavu Katte where 30.56 acres of land had been acquired for this purpose. Prof. K.S.V. Shenoy was succeeded by another stalwart Prof. Karimpuzha Ramakrishnan, under whose stewardship the college the college started gaining importance as a premium institution of higher learning. During this time the institution became a full-fledged first grade college with the opening of third year degree classes. Prof. Karimpuzha Ramakrishnan continued up to 19-11-1962 when Prof. V. Gopalan Nair was reposted as principal, and he continued in the post until he was promoted as Director of Collegiate Education on 13-06-1967. B.Sc. Geology main was started in 1962-1963 and B.A.Kannada in 1963–1964. During 1964-65 Physics degree course was started.

With the formation of the University of Calicut in July 1968, the college became affiliated to this new university. Two new courses B.Sc. Zoology and B.A. Arabic  were started in this year. A women's hostel was started on 1 February 1969. The college was raised to the status of a postgraduate institute with the starting of M.A. Kannada during 1969–1970. B.A. degree courses in History was started in 1975–1976. B.Sc. courses in Chemistry and Botany were started in 1978–1979. M.Sc. Geology was started in 1979–1980. M.A. Economics and M.Sc. Mathematics were started during 1984–1985. M.A. Arabic courses was started during 1993–1994.

When Kannur University was established in the year 1996, the college became affiliated to Kannur University. Kannur  University Centre for Regional Languages (Kannada) was started in the college in 1997–1998 with a course in M.Phil.

As of now the college offers 14 undergraduate courses, seven post-graduate courses and 5 research centres offering PhD programmes in Kannada, statistics, geology, chemistry and zoology. The college is re-accredited with NAAC ‘A’ grade.

College emblem 
The college emblem graphically conveys the message that the institution constantly imparts knowledge, which enables to live the motto, Live to Serve.

Courses offered

Degree courses 

Additional languages: Malayalam, Hindi, Arabic, Kannada, Sanskrit

Post-graduation courses

PhD research centers

Departments
 Department of Arabic
 Department of Economics
 Department of Botany
 Department of Commerce
 Department of Chemistry
 Department of Computer Science
 Department of English
 Department of Geology
 Department of Hindi
 Department of History
 Department of Journalism
 Department of Kannada
 Department of Malayalam
 Department of Mathematics
 Department of Physics
 Department of Physical Education
 Department of Political Science
 Department of Sanskrit
 Department of Statistics
 Department of Zoology

References

External links

 
 Kannur University

Colleges affiliated to Kannur University
Colleges in Kasaragod district
Colleges in Kerala